Isis Margarita Finlay (15 September 1934 in Cuba – 24 May 2007 in Miami, Florida) was the 1954 Miss Cuba.

After she won the Miss Cuba pageant in Cuba, she traveled to Long Island, California for the Third Miss Universe Pageant. For the next 53 years, she traveled to 51 countries. She was  the great-grand-niece of the well-known Cuban doctor Carlos Finlay (1833–1915). She had four children.

References
 (A re-print of an article in the May 27, 2007 edition of the Miami Herald)

1934 births
2007 deaths
Cuban beauty pageant winners
Cuban emigrants to the United States
Cuban female models
Miss Universe 1954 contestants